Apokalypsis is the Greek word for "revelation". It may refer to:

Revelation
Book of Revelation
Apocalypse

Music
Apokalypsis, Greek-language oratorio and album by René Clemencic
Apokalypsis (Chelsea Wolfe album)

See also 
Apocalypse (disambiguation)